Symphorien Mouard (born 1828 in Sombernon) was a French clergyman and prelate for the Roman Catholic Archdiocese of Lahore. He was appointed bishop in 1888. He died in 1890.

References 

1828 births
1890 deaths
French Roman Catholic bishops